Bert Darrell (19 November 1905 – 9 April 1983) was a Bermudian sailor. He competed in the 5.5 Metre event at the 1960 Summer Olympics.

References

External links
 

1930 births
2011 deaths
Bermudian male sailors (sport)
Olympic sailors of Bermuda
Sailors at the 1960 Summer Olympics – 5.5 Metre